Peter Kohnke (9 October 1941 – 3 April 1975) was a German sports shooter. He won a gold medal in the 50 metre rifle prone event at the 1960 Summer Olympics in Rome. He also competed at the 1968 Summer Olympics. He died in a traffic accident, aged 33.

References

1941 births
1975 deaths
Sportspeople from Königsberg
German male sport shooters
ISSF rifle shooters
Olympic shooters of the United Team of Germany
Olympic shooters of West Germany
Olympic gold medalists for the United Team of Germany
Olympic medalists in shooting
Shooters at the 1960 Summer Olympics
Shooters at the 1968 Summer Olympics
Medalists at the 1960 Summer Olympics